Ashwin is an Indian actor working in Tamil cinema. He is the son of actor-politician S. Ve. Sekhar.

Personal life
Ashwin got engaged to Shruti Venkatraman at the Convention Centre at GRT on Chennai on 8 May 2011. Shruthi is the daughter of Congress member Madangi Venkatraman of Gobichettipalayam, Erode.

Filmography

References

External links

Living people
Male actors in Tamil cinema
Indian male film actors
Date of birth missing (living people)
Place of birth missing (living people)
Year of birth missing (living people)